Citheronula is a genus of moths in the family Saturniidae first described by Charles Duncan Michener in 1949.

Species
Citheronula armata (W. Rothschild, 1907)

References

Ceratocampinae